is a Japanese former swimmer who competed in the 1988 Summer Olympics and in the 1992 Summer Olympics.

References

1973 births
Living people
Japanese female freestyle swimmers
Olympic swimmers of Japan
Swimmers at the 1988 Summer Olympics
Swimmers at the 1992 Summer Olympics
Swimmers at the 1990 Asian Games
Universiade medalists in swimming
Universiade bronze medalists for Japan
Asian Games competitors for Japan
Medalists at the 1993 Summer Universiade
20th-century Japanese women